Hildegarde Naughton (born 1 May 1977) is an Irish Fine Gael politician who has served as Government Chief Whip and Minister of State at the Department of Health since December 2022. She has served as a Minister of State attending cabinet since June 2020. She has been a Teachta Dála (TD) for the Galway West constituency since 2016. She previously served as Chair of the Committee on Communications, Climate Action and the Environment from 2016 to 2020 and Mayor of Galway from 2011 to 2012. She also served as a Senator from 2013 to 2016, after being nominated by the Taoiseach.

Personal life
Naughton was born in Galway in 1977, she is from Oranmore. Naughton is the only daughter of P.J. and Marguerite Naughton. Her father was a member of the Fine Gael National Executive. She was teacher at St. Patrick's Boys School in Galway. She is a classically trained soprano, and in 2008 won the Association of Irish Musical Societies' Best Actress award for her role as Eliza Doolittle in the Galway Patrician Musical Society's production of My Fair Lady. She speaks fluent French. She was co-ordinator of the 2007 Telethon People in Need Campaign for Galway City and County, which raised over €300,000 for local charities.

Shortly after her appointment as Government Chief Whip and Minister of State at the Department of Health with special responsibility for Public Health, Wellbeing and the National Drugs, Naughton told the media she had smoked cannabis in her 20s.

Political career
Naughton surprised many by unseating party colleague John Mulholland at the 2009 local election in the Galway City West local electoral area (Salthill-Claddagh-Knocknacarra). John Cunningham suggested that personal networking, effective postering, and the endorsement of Maureen Egan aided her victory. After her election, she was a director on Galway City Partnership Board and a member of Galway City Council's Transport Strategic Policy Committee and the Galway City Vocational Education Committee.

Naughton ran unsuccessfully for the Dáil at the 2011 general election in Galway West. During the campaign in January, she alleged that councillors had been "doing the bidding" of a "hidden elite" for 20 years. In June, she was Fine Gael's choice for Mayor of Galway for 2011–12, part of a pact rotating the post between Fine Gael, Labour Party, and some Independent members. Her nomination was in doubt after Councillors objected to her allegation the previous January. She unreservedly withdrew the comments before the mayoral vote was taken.

She caused controversy when she used her casting vote as Mayor to deny David Norris the right to address Galway City Council during his campaign to get a nomination for the 2011 presidential election. She later claimed it was a "misunderstanding".

At the 2011 general election, Naughton was one of four Fine Gael candidates for the five seats in Galway West; Seán Kyne and Brian Walsh were elected, while Naughton and Fidelma Healy Eames were unsuccessful. In July 2013, Walsh was expelled from the Fine Gael parliamentary party for voting against the party whip on the Protection of Life During Pregnancy Bill 2013. Healy Eames was expelled a week after Walsh for opposing the same bill in the Seanad. On 19 July, Naughton was appointed to the Seanad by Taoiseach Enda Kenny. Walsh was readmitted into the Fine Gael parliamentary party in 2014, but due to health reasons, he stood down before the general election.

At the 2016 general election, Naughton was elected to the Dáil alongside her party colleague Seán Kyne. In October 2019, she was appointed to the chair of the Dáil committee investigating ethics complaints about members who voted on behalf of colleagues. She was later forced to resign after it came to light that she had done the same on several occasions. Voting on behalf of colleagues in the Dáil was not permitted. At the 2020 general election, Naughton was re-elected to the Dáil, as the sole Fine Gael TD in the five-seat constituency.

In 2020, at the formation of the 32nd Government of Ireland, Naughton was appointed as one of three Ministers of State attending cabinet. She was appointed as Minister of State at the Department of Transport with special responsibility for International and Road Transport and Logistics and Minister of State at the Department of the Environment, Climate and Communications with special responsibility for Postal Policy and Eircodes. From 27 April to 1 November 2021, Naughton was assigned additional responsibilities as Minister of State at the Department of Justice with responsibility for criminal justice during the maternity leave of Minister for Justice Helen McEntee.

In December 2022, she was appointed as Government Chief Whip and Minister of State at the Department of Health with special responsibility for Public Health, Wellbeing and the National Drugs Strategy following the appointment of Leo Varadkar as Taoiseach.

References

External links
 Hildegarde Naughton's page on the Fine Gael website

1977 births
Living people
Fine Gael TDs
Irish schoolteachers
Mayors of Galway
Members of the 24th Seanad
Members of the 32nd Dáil
Members of the 33rd Dáil
21st-century women Teachtaí Dála
Politicians from County Galway
Nominated members of Seanad Éireann
Fine Gael senators
Local councillors in Galway (city)
Ministers of State of the 33rd Dáil
Women ministers of state of the Republic of Ireland
21st-century women members of Seanad Éireann
Government Chief Whip (Ireland)